Henri Amazouze (1 March 1937 – 8 August 2020) was a French sprint canoer who competed in the early 1960s. At the 1960 Summer Olympics in Rome, he was eliminated in the repechages of the K-1 4 × 500 m event.

References

1937 births
2020 deaths
Canoeists at the 1960 Summer Olympics
French male canoeists
Olympic canoeists of France
20th-century French people